Anne Kauffman is an American director known primarily for her work on new plays, mainly in the New York area. She is a founding member of the theater group the Civilians.

Early life and education
Kauffman received her undergraduate degree from Stanford University and her MFA from the graduate directing program at UCSD.

Kauffman has said: "I'm attracted to plays that need the theater and belong only to the theater,...I've always been very interested in writers who have a kind of mystery to them--something that makes me work a little hard and is compelling and mysterious...trying to get at the world from a slightly odd angle....I do love working with a playwright more than once."

Career
Kauffman directed The Thugs by Adam Bock Off-Broadway at the Soho Rep in 2006. She received the 2007 Obie Award for direction for this production.

Kauffman directed Amy Herzog's Belleville Off-Broadway at the New York Theatre Workshop in 2013. The reviewer for Time magazine wrote: "She [Kauffman] serves the play wonderfully, with a light but firm hand, for a tense, almost breathtaking hour and a half." She also directed Belleville at the Steppenwolf Theatre, Chicago, in 2013. The reviewer of the Chicago production noted "Kauffmann's tense, adroit, nuanced, deftly cast production..." She directed Amy Herzog's Mary Jane Off-Broadway at the New York Theatre Workshop in Sept. 2017. Jesse Green, in his review for The New York Times, noted "Ms. Kauffman's ideally detailed direction."

Past Off-Broadway productions include Maple and Vine by Jordan Harrison (2011) and Pulitzer Prize finalist play Detroit by Lisa D'Amour (2012) at Playwrights Horizons;. Stunning by David Adjmi (2009) and Slowgirl by Greg Pierce (2012) at LCT3 ; You'd Better Sit Down: Tales From My Parents' Divorce (Written with The Civilians) at The Flea Theater (2012); This Wide Night by Chloe Moss by Naked Angels Theater Company (2010); Sixty Miles to Silver Lake by Dan Le Franc at Soho Rep (2009); Have You Seen Steve Steven by Ann Marie Healy with 13P (2007); God's Ear by Jenny Schwartz at The Vineyard and New Georges (2007); and The Ladies by Anne Washburn  at the Cherry Lane Theater and Dixon Place (2004).

In 2016, she directed Smokefall by Noah Haidle with Zachary Quinto at the Off-Broadway Lucille Lortel Theatre in an MCC production; she had previously directed the play at the South Coast Repertory, and the Goodman Theatre in 2013. She directed The Nether by Jennifer Haley in 2015 for MCC. She directed Marjorie Prime by Jordan Harrison at Playwrights Horizons in 2015. This was the second time that Kauffman and Harrison worked together. In 2014 she directed the Off-Broadway production of You Got Older by Clare Barron at HERE. She directed Sundown, Yellow Moon by Rachel Bonds, which premiered Off-Broadway at the WP Theater in a co-production by Ars Nova and WP in 2017. Ben Brantley, in his review for The New York Times, noted the "beautifully acted production...directed with probing sensitivity by Anne Kauffman."

In 2017, she directed Marvin's Room on Broadway for Roundabout Theatre Company, Assassins at Encores! Off-Center, Mary Jane at New York Theatre Workshop, and Hundred Days at the Under the Radar Festival and New York Theatre Workshop. In 2018, she directed The Lucky Ones at the Connelly Theater for Ars Nova, and Hundred Days at La Jolla Playhouse, where she is about to direct Lindsey Ferrentino's The Year to Come.

Kauffman's past regional productions include Body Awareness by Annie Baker (2012) at the Wilma Theater; and Pulitzer Prize finalist Becky Shaw by Gina Gionfriddo (2009); The Flea and the Professor by Jordan Harrison at the Arden Theatre Company (2011); Six Degrees of Separation by John Guare at the Williamstown Theatre Festival (2010); We Have Always Lived in the Castle by Adam Bock and Todd Almond at Yale Rep (2010); The Communist Dracula Pageant by Anne Washburn at ART (2008); Expecting Isabel by Lisa Loomer and Doubt by John Patrick Shanley at Asolo Repertory Theatre (2007); Act A Lady by Jordan Harrison at the Humana Festival of New American Plays (2006); and Typographer's Dream and Shaker Chair by Adam Bock (2005).

She is a Sundance program associate, a usual suspect at New York Theatre Workshop, an alumna of the Soho Rep Writers and Directors Lab, a current member of Soho Rep's Artistic Council, Lincoln Center Directors Lab, the Drama League of New York, a founding member of the Civilians, an associate artist with Clubbed Thumb and co-creator of the CT Directing Fellowship, and member of New Georges Kitchen Cabinet. From 2000 to 2006, Kauffman was on the directing faculty at NYU. Kauffman is an executive board member of the Stage Directors and Choreographers Society.

Kauffman is the artistic director of New York City Center's Encores! Off-Center, and was the co-artistic director with Jeanine Tesori for the 2018 season. Encores! Off-Center has been on hiatus since 2020.

Awards and honors
She received the 2007 Obie Award for direction of The Thugs.

She received the 2015 Obie Award, for sustained excellence of direction.

Other awards include a Lilly Award for directing in 2010, the Alan Schneider Director Award, the Joan and Joseph Cullman award for Exceptional Creativity from Lincoln Center, 2004 Big Easy Award, and Ambie Award (for The Children's Hour) in New Orleans.

She has received Philadelphia's Barrymore Award for Best Direction in 2010 for Becky Shaw, and in 2012 for Body Awareness.

Detroit by Lisa D'Amour was listed in the top 10 productions of 2012 by The New York Times, New York Magazine, Time and TimeOut NY.

She was nominated for the 2015 Drama Desk Award, Outstanding Director of a Play for You Got Older by Clare Barron.

She was nominated for the 2011 Lucille Lortel Award, Outstanding Director for This Wide Night by Chloe Moss.

She was nominated for the 2013 Lucille Lortel Award, Outstanding Director for Belleville.

She was nominated for the 2016 Lucille Lortel Award, Outstanding Director for Marjorie Prime.

She was nominated for the 2016 Lucille Lortel Award, Outstanding Director, for Adam Bock's A Life.

She received both the 2018 Lortel Award for Outstanding Direction of a play, and the 2018 Obie Award for Directing for Mary Jane.

References

External links
Internet Off-Broadway Database
tcg.org

Year of birth missing (living people)
Living people
American theatre directors
Women theatre directors
University of California, San Diego alumni